Hill is a surname of English and Scottish origin, meaning "a person who lived on a hill". It is the 36th most common surname in England, the 18th common surname in Scotland, and the 37th most common surname in the United States.

A 

 Aaron Hill (disambiguation), multiple people
 Adin Hill (born 1996), Canadian ice hockey goaltender
 Agnes Leonard Hill (1842–1917), American journalist, author, poet, newspaper founder/publisher, evangelist, social reformer
 Al Hill (disambiguation), multiple people
 Alan Hill (disambiguation), multiple people
 Alban Hill (died 1559), Welsh physician
 Albert Hill (disambiguation), multiple people
 Alec Hill (1916–2008), Australian military historian and academic
 Alex Hill (disambiguation), multiple people
 Alexander Hill (disambiguation), multiple people
 Alex Hyndman Alexandra Hill (born 1978), British journalist and newscaster
 Alexandra Hill Tinoco, Salvadorian politician
 Alexis Hill (disambiguation), multiple people
 Alfred Hill (disambiguation), multiple people
 Alisa Hill (born 1965), American middle-distance runner
 Allen Hill (disambiguation)
 Ally Hill (1934–2018), Scottish footballer
 A. P. Hill (Ambrose Powell Hill) (1825–1865), Confederate general in the American Civil War
 Andre Hill (died 2020), African-American man killed by police
 Andrew Hill (disambiguation), multiple people
 Andy Hill (disambiguation), multiple people
 Anita Hill (born 1956), American lawyer, alleged victim of sexual harassment by Clarence Thomas
 Anthony Hill (disambiguation), multiple people
 Antony Hill (disambiguation), multiple people
 Archibald Hill (A. V. Hill) (1886–1977), British Nobel laureate for Physiology or Medicine (1922)
 Arthur Hill (disambiguation), multiple people
 A. T. Hill (Asa Thomas Hill) (1871–1953), American businessman and archaeologist
 Aubrey Hill (1972–2020), American football coach
 Austin Bradford Hill (1897–1991), British epidemiologist and statistician

B 
Baron Hill (disambiguation), multiple people
Basil Alexander Hill (1880–1960), English rugby union international
Ben Hill (disambiguation), multiple people
Benjamin Hill (disambiguation), multiple people
Benny Hill (1924–1992), British comedian and actor
Bernard Hill (born 1944), British actor
Bert Hodge Hill (1874–1958), American archaeologist
Bertie Hill (Albert Edwin Hill) (1926–2005), British equestrian, gold medallist at the 1956 Summer Olympics
Betty Hill (disambiguation), multiple people
Bill Hill (baseball) (William Cicero "Bill" Hill, 1874–1938), American Major League Baseball pitcher
Billy Hill (disambiguation), multiple people
B. J. Hill (American football) (born 1996), American football player
Bob Hill (disambiguation), multiple people
Bobby Hill (disambiguation), multiple people
Boyd Hill (1878–1908), American football and basketball coach
Brad Hill (disambiguation), multiple people
Bradford Hill (born 1967), American politician (Massachusetts)
Bradley Hill (footballer) (born 1993), Australian rules footballer
Brian Hill (disambiguation), multiple people
Bronwyn Hill (born 1960), British civil servant
Bryan Hill (disambiguation), multiple people
Bunker Hill (musician) (stage name of David Walker, 1941–1986), American rhythm & blues and gospel singer.

C 
Calvin Hill (born 1947), American football player and sports executive, father of basketball player Grant Hill
Carl Alexander Gibson-Hill (19111963), British physician, naturalist and museum curator
Carl Fredrik Hill (18491911), Swedish painter
Charles Hill (disambiguation), multiple people
 Lady Charlotte Hill (17941821), daughter of Arthur Hill, 2nd Marquess of Downshire
 Lady Charlotte Augusta Hill (18151861), daughter of Arthur Hill, 3rd Marquess of Downshire and wife of Sir George Chetwynd, 3rd Baronet
 Carole Hill, American anthropologist and professor.
Christopher Hill (historian) (John Edward Christopher Hill) (19122003), British historian and textbook author
Christopher J. Hill (born 1948), British academic
Cindy Hill (politician) (Cynthia Jo Hill) (born 1962), American politician (Wyoming)
Clarence Hill (disambiguation), multiple people
Cliff Hill (1943–2021), British rugby league player
Colin Hill (disambiguation), multiple people
Cowboy Hill (American football) (1899–1966), American football player

D 
Damon Hill (born 1960), British racing driver, Formula One World Champion (1996), son of Graham Hill
Dan Hill (born 1954), Canadian Tenor singer/songwriter
Dana Hill (196496), American actor and voice actor
Daniel Hill (disambiguation), multiple people
Danny Hill (disambiguation), multiple people
Darryl Hill (disambiguation), multiple people
Dave Hill (disambiguation), multiple people
David Hill (disambiguation), multiple people
David Mark Hill (19602008), American spree killer
Debra Hill (1950–2005) is an American film producer and screenwriter who is best known for producing various works of John Carpenter.
Delano Hill (American football) (born 1995), American football player
Delmas Carl Hill (190689), United States federal judge
Dennis Hill (born 1929), English professional footballer
Derek Hill (disambiguation), multiple people
Dick Hill (disambiguation), multiple people
Douglas Hill (19352007), Canadian science fiction author, editor and reviewer
Douglas Hill (musician) (born 1946), American  composer, author and French horn soloist
Drew Hill (19562011), American football wide receiver
Dulé Hill (born 1975), American actor
Dusty Hill (1949–2021), American musician associated with the band ZZ Top
Dwayne Hill (born 1966), Canadian actor

E 
Ebenezer J. Hill (18451917), American politician (Connecticut)
Ed Hill (disambiguation), multiple people
Eddie Hill (born 1936), American drag racer
E.D. Hill (born 1962), American journalist and news anchor for CNN
Edward Hill (disambiguation), multiple people
Edwin Hill (disambiguation), multiple people
Eleanor J. Hill (born 1950), American attorney and public servant
Eliza Trask Hill (1840–1908), American activist, journalist, philanthropist
Elizabeth Hill (disambiguation), multiple people
Ellsworth Jerome Hill (18331917), American minister and botanist
Eric Hill (disambiguation), multiple people
Erica Hill (Erica Hill-Yount, born Erica Ruth Hill in 1976), American news presenter
Ernest Hill (disambiguation), multiple people
Ernestine Hill (18991972), Australian journalist, travel writer and novelist
Eustace St Clair Hill (18731953), English priest, headmaster, and monk
Evan Hill (19192010), American journalist and college professor

F 
Faith Hill (born 1967), American country singer
Fanny Hill, fictional Woman of Pleasure created by the British novelist John Cleland
Fiona Hill (disambiguation), multiple people
Francis Hill (disambiguation), multiple people
Frank Hill (disambiguation), multiple people
Fred Hill (disambiguation), multiple people
Frederick Hill (disambiguation), multiple people

G 
Garrett Hill (born 1996), American baseball player
Geoffrey Hill (1932–2016), English poet
George Hill (disambiguation), multiple people
Georgiana Hill (1858–1924), British social historian and women's rights activist
Gerald Hill (disambiguation), multiple people
Gerry Hill (1913–2006), English cricketer
Gordon Hill (disambiguation), multiple people
Graham Hill (19291975), British Formula One double World Champion and the only winner of the "Triple Crown of Motorsport", father of Damon Hill
Graham Hill (judge) (19382005), Judge of the Federal Court of Australia
Graham Hill (academic) (active 19972005), Zimbabwean veterinary surgeon and academic
Grant Hill (born 1972), American basketball player
Grant Hill (disambiguation), multiple other people

H 
Hainer Hill (1913–2001), German scenic designer, costume designer, painter, graphic artist and theatre photographer
Hank Hill, fictional character in the animated series King of the Hill
 Harold Hill, fictional character in The Music Man
Harry Hill (disambiguation), multiple people
Helen Hill (19702007), American animation filmmaker and social activist 
Helena Hill (18751958), American suffragist
Henry Hill (1943–2012), American organized crime figure
Henry Hill (disambiguation), multiple other people
Holton Hill (born 1997), American football player
Howard Hill, American archer

I 
Ian Hill (born 1951), British musician associated with the band Judas Priest
Ian Hill (diplomat) (active 1993 and after), New Zealand diplomat
Irving Hill (191598), American lawyer and judge

J 
J. Hill (born James Hill), American music arranger and brass player
J. Hill (novelist), pseudonym by Spanish writer J. Mallorquí.
J. D. Hill (born 1948), American football wide receiver
J. J. Hill (disambiguation), multiple people
J. Lister Hill (1894–1984), American politician
J. Richard Hill (1929–2017), British admiral
J. Tomilson Hill (active 1973 and after), American businessman
Jack Hill (disambiguation), multiple people
Jake Hill (born 1994), British racing driver
James Hill (disambiguation), multiple people
Jane Hill (disambiguation), multiple people
Jason Hill (disambiguation), multiple people
Jay Hill (disambiguation), multiple people
Jemele Hill (born 1975), American sports journalist
Jeremy Hill (baseball) (born 1977), American baseball player
Jeremy Hill (American football) (born 1992), American football player
Jerry Hill (disambiguation), multiple people
Jess Hill (writer), Australian investigative reporter and author
Jim Hill (disambiguation), multiple people
Jimmy Hill (disambiguation), multiple people
Jo Hill (Joanne Kay Hill, born 1973), Australian women's basketball player
Joan Robinson Hill (193169), American horsewoman and socialite
Joe Hill (disambiguation), multiple people
Johannes Hill (born 1988), German baritone
John Hill (disambiguation), multiple people
 Johnnie Hill (John Hamar Hill, 19121998), British Royal Air Force officer
 Johnnie Hill, American actor who played the title role in the 1976 movie Velvet Smooth
Jon Hill (disambiguation), multiple people
Jonah Hill (Jonah Hill Feldstein, born 1983), American actor, filmmaker, and comedian
Jonathan Hill (disambiguation), multiple people
 Jonny Hill (:de:Jonny Hill, born 1940), Austrian singer who recorded a German version of the Red Sovine song Teddy Bear
Jonny Hill (rugby union) (born 1994), English professional rugby union player
Jordan Hill (disambiguation), multiple people
Joseph Hill (disambiguation), multiple people
Josephine Hill (18991989), American movie actor
Joyce Hill (1929–2021), American professional baseball player
Julia Butterfly Hill (Julia Lorraine Hill, born 1974), American environmental activist and tax redirection advocate
Justice Hill (born 1997), American football player
Justin Hill (disambiguation), multiple people

K 
K. J. Hill (born 1997), American football player
Karen Hill (disambiguation), multiple people
Karl Hill (1831–1893), German baritone opera singer
Karl Hill (musician) (born 1975), American musician
Keith Hill (disambiguation), multiple people
Ken Hill (disambiguation), multiple people
Kenneth Hill (disambiguation), multiple people
Kenny Hill (disambiguation), multiple people
Kerry Hill (1943–2018), Australian architect
Kim Hill (disambiguation), multiple people
Kylin Hill (born 1998), American football player

L 
Lano Hill (born 1995), American football player
Lauryn Hill (born 1975), American hip hop singer
Lawrence Hill (born ), Canadian novelist and memoirist
Len Hill (disambiguation), multiple people
Leonard Hill (disambiguation), multiple people
Lester S. Hill (1891–1961), American mathematician and educator
Lionel Hill (1881–1963), politician, Premier of South Australia 1930–1933
Lovette Hill (1907–1989), American college baseball coach
Lydia Cecilia Hill (1913–1940), British cabaret dancer

M 
Mabel Betsy Hill (1877 – ?), American illustrator and author of children's books
Malcolm Hill (basketball) (born 1995), American player in the Israel League
Marc Hill (born 1952), American Major League Baseball catcher
Marc Lamont Hill (born 1978), American academic, journalist, author, activist and television personality
 Lord Marcus Hill (Marcus Sandys, 3rd Baron Sandys, 1798–1863), British politician
Mark Hill (disambiguation), multiple people
Marquise Hill (1982–2007), American football defensive end
Mary Hill (disambiguation), multiple people
Matt Hill (disambiguation), multiple people
Matthew Hill (disambiguation), multiple people
Melanie Hill (born 1962), English actor
Mervyn Hill (1902–1948), Welsh-born cricketer
Micaiah John Muller Hill (1856–1929), British mathematician
Michael Hill (disambiguation), multiple people
Mick Hill (disambiguation), multiple people
Mike Hill (disambiguation), multiple people
 Mildred and Patty Hill, American writers of the song "Happy Birthday to You"
Minnie Mossman Hill (1863–1946), American steamboat captain
Miranda Hill (1836–1910), British social reformer
Mitch Hill (active 2014), American college baseball coach
 Montero Hill (born 1999), American rapper known professionally as Lil Nas X

N 
Nancy Hill (born 1935), Australian basketball player
Napoleon Hill (18831970), American author
Ned C. Hill (born 1945), American business management professor
 Neil Hill, member of The Good Men Project
 Neil Hill, member of Australian band SPK (band)
Noel Hill (disambiguation), multiple people
Norm Hill (disambiguation), multiple people
Norman Hill (disambiguation), multiple people

O 
Octavia Hill (1838–1912), English social reformer

P 
Paul Hill (disambiguation), multiple people
Perry Hill (baseball) (born 1952), American baseball coach
Pete Hill (18821951), American outfielder and manager in baseball's Negro leagues
Peter Hill (disambiguation), multiple people
Phil Hill (disambiguation), multiple people
Philip Hill (disambiguation), multiple people
Phillip Hill (disambiguation), multiple people
 Major Ployer Peter Hill (18941935), USAF pilot and namegiver to Hill Air Force Base

R
Raewyn Hill (born 1972), New Zealand choreographer and dancer 
Ralph Hill (representative) (182799), American lawyer and politician
Ralph Hill (music critic) (190050), British music critic
Ralph Hill (190894), American middle-distance runner
Ralph Nading Hill (191787), American writer and preservationist
Ralyn M. Hill (18991977), American Medal of Honor recipient
Reg Hill (Reginald Eric Hill, 19141999), English model maker and television producer
Reginald Hill (19362012), British crime novelist
Rich Hill (baseball coach) (born ), American college baseball coach
Rich Hill (pitcher) (born 1980), American baseball pitcher
Richard Hill (disambiguation), multiple people
Rick Hill (Richard "Rick" Hill) (born 1946), American politician
Rina Hill (Rina Bradshaw-Hill) (born 1969), Australian triathlete
Rob Hill (disambiguation), multiple people
Robert Hill (disambiguation), multiple people
Robin Hill (disambiguation), multiple people
Rodney Hill (19212011), British applied mathematician
Roland Hill (journalist) (19202014), German-born British journalist and biographer
Rose Hill (actress) (19142003), British actress who starred in the sitcom 'Allo 'Allo!
Rose Hill (athlete) (born 1956), British wheelchair athlete
Rowland Hill, 1st Viscount Hill (1772–1842), British Army general during the Napoleonic Wars
Rowland Hill (disambiguation), multiple people

S 
Scott Hill (disambiguation), multiple people
Sean Hill (ice hockey) (born 1970), American ice hockey player
Sean Hill (American football) (born 1971), American football player
Sharon A. Hill (born 1970), American science writer and speaker
Shaun Hill (born 1980), American football player
Shawn Hill (born 1981), Canadian baseball pitcher
Sidney Hill, British merchant and philanthropist
Stephen Hill (disambiguation), multiple people
Steven Hill (disambiguation), multiple people
Stuart Hill (disambiguation), multiple people
Sue Hill (born 1955), British healthcare scientist
Susan Hill (born 1942), British author of fiction and non-fiction
Sylvia Louise Hill, also known as Sylvia Williams (1936–1996), American museum director, curator, art historian, and scholar of African art.

T 
Terence Hill (born Mario Girotti, 1939), Italian actor
Terry Hill (born 1972), Australian rugby league player
Theodora Hill (born 1946), New Zealand Olympic gymnast
Thomas Hill (disambiguation), multiple people
Timothy Hill (disambiguation), multiple people
Tiny Hill (rugby union) (1927–2019), New Zealand rugby union player
Tom Hill (disambiguation), multiple people
Tommy Hill (disambiguation), multiple people
Tony Hill (disambiguation), multiple people
Trey Hill (born 2000), American football player
Trysten Hill (born 1998), American football player
Tyler Hill (racing driver) (born 1994), American NASCAR driver
Tyreek Hill (born 1994), American football player

V
Vernon Hill (disambiguation), multiple people
Vince Hill (Vincent Hill, born 1934), English traditional pop music singer, songwriter and record producer
Vince Hill (American football) (born 1985), American football player
Viola Hill (1892–after 1940), suffragist and musician

W 
Walter Hill (disambiguation), multiple people
Will Hill (born 1990), American college football player
William Hill (disambiguation), multiple people

Z 
Zach Hill (born 1979), American multi-instrumentalist
Zak Hill (born 1981), American football coach
Zanzye H.A. Hill (1906–1935), American lawyer

See also 
Hill (disambiguation)
Hills (disambiguation)
Hull (surname)
General Hill (disambiguation)
Justice Hill (disambiguation)

External links 
 Hill DNA Project

References 

English-language surnames
Surnames of English origin
English toponymic surnames